Stevens Creek is an unincorporated community and census-designated place (CDP) in Grayson County, Virginia, United States. As of the 2020 census, it had a population of 240.

The CDP is in eastern Grayson County, bordered to the southeast by Hilltown and to the northeast by Carroll County.

References 

Populated places in Grayson County, Virginia
Census-designated places in Grayson County, Virginia
Census-designated places in Virginia